A list of films produced in Hong Kong in 1998:.

See also
1998 in Hong Kong

External links
 IMDB listing of Hong Kong films
 Hong Kong films of 1998 at HKcinemamagic.com

1998
Hong Kong
1998 in Hong Kong